The original Japanese-based Universal Wrestling Federation (UWF) was a Japanese professional wrestling promotion from 1984 to 1986, formed by wrestlers who had left New Japan Pro-Wrestling. It was a pioneer in shoot-style wrestling, which emphasized legitimate techniques and realism. It was revived as the Newborn UWF in 1988. Newborn UWF lasted until 1990. It was revived again in 1991 as Union of Wrestling Forces International (UWF International or UWFi), which in turn lasted until 1996.

Although short-lived, the UWF spawned a number of successor "shoot-wrestling" promotions collectively nicknamed the "U-Kei", and also served as a predecessor for Japanese mixed martial arts, with many of its alumni founding proto-MMA organizations such as Shooto, Pancrase and RINGS, eventually leading to the creation of Pride FC.

Original UWF
The original roster included Rusher Kimura, Akira Maeda, Ryuma Go, Mach Hayato, and Gran Hamada. Soon, however, they were joined by Yoshiaki Fujiwara, Nobuhiko Takada, Satoru Sayama (the original Tiger Mask) and Kazuo Yamazaki, and this changed the orientation of the UWF's wrestling from the traditional style to a more martial arts oriented style. Maeda, Fujiwara, Takada, Sayama and Yamazaki had been martial artists before joining New Japan Pro-Wrestling, and they began incorporating amateur wrestling and other legitimate martial arts techniques, including catch wrestling and judo submission holds, and kickboxing, which created a new form of wrestling called shoot-style. Kimura, Go, and Hamada, unable to cope with the new style, decided to leave and join All Japan Pro Wrestling instead.

In early 1984, UWF President Hisashi Shinma brokered a deal with the World Wrestling Federation which resulted in a UWF/WWF working relationship. Through this working relationship, one of UWF's top stars Akira Maeda toured the United States with the WWF and even won the promotion's International Heavyweight Championship. The relationship ended on July 23, 1984 after President Shinma jumped from UWF to All Japan Pro Wrestling.

In 1984 another former New Japan wrestler, Osamu Kido, who had trained under Karl Gotch, joined the UWF. But just as the promotion fledged, its top star Sayama started becoming alienated from the rest of the promotion. While the reforms introduced by Sayama were successful in draws, most wrestlers believed he was cramming too much creative power and booking UWF only for himself. This came to a head in September 1985, when Sayama and Maeda. allegedly stopped pulling their punches and kicks, in a match that fans in Japan refer to as "going cement."  A second, brutal match of this kind took place in September of that year, when Maeda and Sayama again began to lay in their strikes.  The match ended when Maeda did not pull a kick and instead kicked Sayama hard in the groin, causing a disqualification.

As a result, Maeda was suspended and later fired by the UWF.  Sayama, embittered with wrestling after this match, left the UWF and was not heard from again in the wrestling world for 11 years. The promotion dissolved and much of the roster returned to New Japan.

Alumni
Natives: Akira Maeda, Gran Hamada, Kazuo Yamazaki, Nobuhiko Takada, Osamu Kido, Rusher Kimura, Ryuma Go, Shigeo Miyato, Super Tiger, Tatsuo Nakano, Yoji Anjo, Yoshiaki Fujiwara
Foreigners: Cuban Assassin, Bob Sweetan, Dave Finlay, Dean Solkoff, Dutch Mantel, El Signo, El Texano, Joe Solkoff, Larry Hamilton, Leo Burke, Lumberjack, Mano Negra, Mark Lewin, Marty Jones, MS-1, Negro Navarro, Perro Aguayo, Phil Lafleur, Raúl Mata, Ray Steele, Scott Casey, Scott McGhee, Sweet Daddy Siki

Newborn UWF
Most of the original UWF roster left New Japan yet again in 1988 to reform the UWF as the Newborn UWF. After Akira Maeda was suspended without pay for intentionally shooting on Riki Choshu and eventually dismissed from New Japan for refusing to go on an overseas excursion to Mexico, Takada, Yamazaki, Yoji Anjo, and rookie Tatsuo Nakano agreed to leave the promotion in February 1988. Newborn UWF actually started in March, with a superb card that set the standard for shoot-style wrestling to follow. Because clean finishes (as in, submissions or knockouts in the middle of the ring) were used, so the fans could see clear-cut winners and losers, it was more accepted as "real fighting" than New Japan or All Japan, which at the time were still using the American-originated standard of countouts and disqualifications.

Shortly after the death of Japanese Emperor Hirohito in early 1989, Maeda held a meeting with New Japan promoter Antonio Inoki, in which they agreed that Fujiwara, who had remained in New Japan but now wanted out, would be allowed to rejoin UWF and bring two of his disciples, Masakatsu Funaki and Minoru Suzuki, with him. That year also saw the debut of Kiyoshi Tamura, who is still recognized as one of the eminent shoot-style pro-wrestlers in Japan.

1990 saw many ups and downs in the short story of Newborn UWF. Future stars Masahito Kakihara and Yusuke Fuke debuted, and a new rulebook was devised in which the first person to score 5 knockdowns (in which the opponent could not get back up at once, similar to boxing knockout attempts) would win, giving the 5-knockdown situation the same weight as a submission. Shinji Jin, a non-wrestler who had taken over for Maeda as promotion president the previous year, wanted to co-promote with other federations and styles, particularly SWS and Hamada's Universal Lucha Libre, but Maeda, resenting other forms of professional wrestling from his New Japan days, decided to put the idea off. This, and the general Japanese economic downturn of the era, prompted Newborn UWF to close its doors with a farewell card on December 1, 1990, in Matsumoto, Nagano.

The UWF wrestlers thus went their separate ways. Most of the roster (Takada, Yamazaki, Anjo, Nakano, Tamura, Kakihara, and Shigeo Miyato) founded UWF International, while Fujiwara, Funaki, Suzuki and Fuke founded Fujiwara Gumi, which made Jin's co-promoting idea into reality. As for Maeda, he, some rookies from the former UWF dojo, and foreign fighters Chris Dolman and Dick Vrij founded Fighting Network RINGS, which would dedicate itself to pure shoot-style wrestling, and later to legitimate mixed martial arts, without actually billing itself as wrestling.

Alumni
Natives: Akira Maeda, Kazuo Yamazaki, Kiyoshi Tamura, Makoto Oe, Masahito Kakihara, Masakatsu Funaki, Minoru Suzuki, Nobuhiko Takada, Shigeo Miyato, Tatsuo Nakano, Tsunehito Naito, Yoji Anjo, Yoshiaki Fujiwara, Yusuke Fuke
Foreigners: Bart Vale, Bob Backlund, Changpuek Kiatsongrit, Chris Dolman, Dick Vrij, Maurice Smith, Norman Smiley, Wayne Shamrock

Legacy 
The UWF was a pioneer. Although its roots were Antonio Inoki's wrestling style (in fact, Maeda, Sayama and Takada credit Inoki as their inspiration to become wrestlers), UWF made wrestling realistic and forced other promotions to follow. In fact, All Japan starting in 1989 abandoned countout and disqualification finishes, which enabled its Triple Crown championship to arise.

The UWF's wrestling style has made inroads in its root promotion, New Japan, where natives Yuji Nagata, Koji Kanemoto, and Katsuyori Shibata use UWF-style kicks despite having never competed in a shoot-style promotion as their peers Minoru Tanaka, Masayuki Naruse, and Masahito Kakihara (who all joined New Japan in the early 2000s) have. Other natives who turned to martial arts fighting such as Tadao Yasuda, Kazuyuki Fujita and Kendo Ka Shin also have UWF inspiration. Above all, however, UWF made it possible for mixed-martial arts circuits to exist and be viable.

In Japan, a professional wrestling and/or mixed martial arts organizations that derived from the idea of UWF are collectively referred to "UWF-kei", or "U-kei" for short.

See also

Professional wrestling in Japan

References

External links
 UWF history, stats, results, & more

Japanese professional wrestling promotions
1984 establishments in Japan
Wrestling Observer Newsletter award winners